Oil imperialism theories assert that direct and indirect control of world petroleum reserves is a root factor in current international politics.

Control of oil
While economists and historians agree that access to and control of the access of others to important resources has throughout history been a factor in warfare and in diplomacy, oil imperialism theorists generally tend to assert that control of petroleum reserves has played an overriding role in international politics since World War I. In recent years, oil resources were certainly important considerations behind the Gulf War, the 2003 invasion of Iraq, and the Libyan Crisis. Some theories hold that access to oil defined 20th-century empires and was the key to the ascendance of the United States as the world's sole superpower, and explained how a transitioning country like Russia was able to obtain rapid GDP growth for a time (see Economy of the Soviet Union).

Criticism
Critics of oil imperialism theories suggest that because the United States has historically been one of the leading oil producers in the world, the United States would be unlikely to predicate its foreign policy on the acquisition of oil with such an undue focus. They point out that, relative to its consumption rate, oil is not an expensive commodity in the market.

See also 
 Petroleum politics
 Hydraulic despotism

References 

Conspiracy theories
Petroleum politics
Imperialism studies